Events from the year 1538 in India.

Events
 The Hussain Shahi dynasty ends
 The Siege of Diu occurred in 1538, when an Ottoman imperial fleet attempted to capture the Indian city of Diu, then held by the Portuguese.
 An Ottoman ship landed at the port of Vizhinjam in 1538.

Births

Deaths
 Ghiyasuddin Mahmud Shah, ruler of the Sultanate of Bengal

See also

 Timeline of Indian history

 
India